The 2009 CAR Development Trophy, also known as the 2008 Africa Junior Trophy, was the sixth edition of third (former second) level rugby union tournament in Africa. The competition involved ten teams that are divided into two zones (North and Center). (No south tournament was played).

North Tournament

 Pool A
{| class="wikitable"
|-
!width=165|Team
!width=30|P
!width=30|W
!width=30|D
!width=30|Lost
!width=30|For
!width=30|Ag.
!width=30|Bonus
!width=30|Points
|- bgcolor=#ccffcc align=center
|align=left| ||3||2||1||0||27||17||0||10
|- align=center
|align=left| ||3||2||0||1||14||11||1||9
|- align=center
|align=left| ||3||1||1||1||16||28||2||8
|- align=center
|align=left| ||3||0||0||3||3||26||2||2
|}

 Pool B
{| class="wikitable"
|-
!width=165|Team
!width=30|P
!width=30|W
!width=30|D
!width=30|Lost
!width=30|For
!width=30|Ag.
!width=30|Bonus
!width=30|Points
|- bgcolor=#ccffcc align=center
|align=left| ||3||2||1||0||66||12||1||11
|- align=center
|align=left| ||3||2||0||1||67||24||1||9
|- align=center
|align=left| ||3||1||1||1||55||22||1||7
|- align=center
|align=left| Togo "B"||3||0||0||3||0||116||0||0
|}

7-8th place play off

5-6th place play off

3-4th place play off

Final

South Tournament

Sources 
[www.rugbyinternational.net/CAR Newsletters/Newsletter%231_EN.pdf CAR NEws Brochure 1]
African CAR Development espnscrum.com

2009
2009 rugby union tournaments for national teams
2009 in African rugby union